The Moonhunter (Thai: 14 tula, songkram prachachon, 14 ตุลา สงครามประชาชน) is a 2001 Thai film, depicting 1973 Thai popular uprising by Seksan Prasertkul, a student leader. It was directed by Bhandit Rittakol and written by Seksan himself. It was Thailand's submission to the 74th Academy Awards for the Academy Award for Best Foreign Language Film, but was not accepted as a nominee.

It is based on the autobiography of Seksan Prasertkul.

See also

Cinema of Thailand
List of submissions to the 74th Academy Awards for Best Foreign Language Film
1973 Thai popular uprising

References

External links

2001 films
Thai-language films
2001 drama films
Thai war drama films
2000s war drama films